Göppert is a German language surname from the personal name Gottfried. Notable people with the name include:
 Friedrich Göppert (1870–1927), German paediatrician
 Heinrich Göppert (1800–1884), German botanist and paleontologist
 Maria Göppert-Mayer (1906–1972), German-born American theoretical physicist

References 

German-language surnames
Surnames from given names